Edward Goodier (15 October 1902 – 4 November 1967) was an English professional footballer and football manager. Born in Farnworth, Lancashire, he played as a wing half for Huddersfield Town, Lancaster Town, Oldham Athletic, Queens Park Rangers, Watford, Crewe Alexandra and Rochdale. He was appointed player-manager at Rochdale in 1938, and continued in that capacity during the Second World War until appointed team manager of Birmingham in August 1943. His contract included provision for a two-year appointment after the war, but after two months in post, he requested and obtained his release for domestic reasons, after which he rejoined Rochdale as secretary-manager. He went on to manage Wigan Athletic and Oldham Athletic. He died in his native Farnworth at the age of 65.

References

1902 births
People from Farnworth
1967 deaths
English footballers
Association football wing halves
Huddersfield Town A.F.C. players
Lancaster City F.C. players
Oldham Athletic A.F.C. players
Queens Park Rangers F.C. players
Watford F.C. players
Crewe Alexandra F.C. players
Rochdale A.F.C. players
English Football League players
English football managers
Rochdale A.F.C. managers
Birmingham City F.C. managers
Wigan Athletic F.C. managers
Oldham Athletic A.F.C. managers
English Football League managers